Triband may mean:
Tri band, an electronic device (e.g. a cellphone) that can operate in three frequency bands
Triband (flag), a flag with three stripes